Kokošnje is a settlement of around 30 houses east of Domžale in the Upper Carniola region of Slovenia.

Name
Kokošnje was attested in written sources as Kokoschin in 1347, Koköschen in 1385, and Kokoschina in 1449, among other spellings.

References

External links

Kokošnje on Geopedia

Populated places in the Municipality of Domžale